The British Wheel of Yoga  was set up in 1965 by Wilfred Clark as a co-ordinating body for yoga groups throughout Britain that welcomed all schools of thought.

It provides level 4 yoga teacher training leading to the Certificate in Yoga Teaching and the Diploma in Teaching Yoga. It is recognised by Sport England as the governing body of yoga in Britain. Its sister organisation, The British Wheel of Yoga Qualifications, provides accreditation to other British yoga teaching organisations.

Origins

The organisation was founded as the Wheel of British Yoga in 1965 by Wilfred Clark, who had started giving evening classes in yoga in 1961. In 1969 it changed its name to  the Western Yoga Federation. In 1973 it gained charitable status and in 1974 it changed its name to the British Wheel of Yoga.

Training and accreditation

At the 2009 AGM the organisation split in two with the establishment of The British Wheel of Yoga Limited and  The British Wheel of Yoga Qualifications Limited. As a result, yoga teacher training and certification are handled independently by the two bodies. The British Wheel of Yoga offers Level 4 qualifications (Certificate in Yoga Teaching, Diploma in Teaching Yoga), stated to be equivalent to an HNC or first-year of a university degree. Accreditation is provided by the BWYQ. The BWY is recognised by Sport England as the governing body of yoga in Britain (and in Northern Ireland, the Yoga Fellowship of Northern Ireland), though without power to enforce decisions. Qualifications are in turn regulated by the regulator of qualification standards Ofqual. By 2015, nine schools were accredited to teach to BWY standards; other schools were free to offer their own courses, often shorter and cheaper than the BWY's, as long as they did not claim to be to approved by the BWY.

See also

 Sexual abuse by yoga gurus#Policy

References

External links

 

Yoga organizations
Yoga training and certification